Imtiaz Ahmed (date of birth unknown) was an Indian cricketer who played several matches for Jammu and Kashmir during the late 1990s and early 2000s. Imtiaz made his first-class debut in October 1996, against Punjab in the 1996–97 edition of the Ranji Trophy. A lower-order batsman, he played a further match in the following season's tournament, and also a single List A match in  the limited-overs Ranji One-Day Trophy. Imtiaz did not play any further matches for Jammu and Kashmir until the 2002–03 season, which were to be his final two at first-class level. He finished his career with 101 runs from four matches at first-class level, with his highest score an innings of 40 runs against Madhya Pradesh in December 2002.

References

20th-century births
Indian cricketers
Jammu and Kashmir cricketers
Kashmiri people
Living people
Place of birth missing (living people)
Year of birth missing (living people)